Bellissimo may refer to:

Bellissimo!, 2016 Todd Smith album
Lodha Bellissimo, skyscraper in Mumbai, India

People with the surname
Daniel Bellissimo (born 1984), Canadian-born Italian ice hockey player
Francesco Bellissimo (born 1979), Italian business-man and chef
Teressa Bellissimo, former owner of Anchor Bar and possible creator of Buffalo Wings recipe
Vince Bellissimo (born 1982), Canadian ice hockey player

See also
Bellissima (disambiguation)